Nicola Delita was an independent record label specializing in Jamaican music.

Releases
 Big Youth - Reggae Gi Dem Dub 1978 - #DSR 7292
 Big Youth - Isaiah First Prophet of Old 1978 - #DSR H 866
 Big Youth - Progress 1979 - #DSR 7146

See also
 List of record labels

References 

Jamaican independent record labels
Record labels established in 1978
Reggae record labels